Sam Scrimgeour (born 28 January 1988) is a British lightweight rower.

Rowing career
Scrimgeour competed at the 2013 World Rowing Championships in Chungju, where he won a bronze medal as part of the lightweight coxless pair with Mark Aldred. He then competed at the 2014 World Rowing Championships in Bosbaan, Amsterdam, where he won a bronze medal as part of the lightweight coxless pair with Jono Clegg. The following year he was part of the British team that topped the medal table at the 2015 World Rowing Championships at Lac d'Aiguebelette in France, where he won a gold medal as part of the lightweight coxless pair with Joel Cassells. 

He won a bronze medal at the 2016 World Rowing Championships in Rotterdam, Netherlands, as part of the lightweight coxless pair with Joel Cassells.

References

1988 births
Living people
British male rowers
World Rowing Championships medalists for Great Britain